Klas Inge "Klabbe" Ingesson (20 August 1968  – 29 October 2014) was a Swedish professional footballer and manager. He spent most of his career as a midfielder in Sweden, Belgium, Netherlands, England, Italy and France. Ingesson represented the Sweden national team on 57 occasions, including the 1990 and 1994 FIFA World Cups, as well as the 1992 European Championship. He was the manager of IF Elfsborg from 2013 until his death in October 2014.

Playing career
He played for IFK Göteborg in Sweden, K.V. Mechelen in Belgium, PSV Eindhoven in the Netherlands, Sheffield Wednesday in England, Bari, Bologna and Lecce in Italy, and Marseille in France.

At Sheffield Wednesday, he encountered players "who went straight to the pub after training but still able to run like wild animals come Saturday". Manager Trevor Francis recruited him to replace Carlton Palmer, but Ingesson only played in 18 games (plus three in the domestic cups). He scored two goals for Sheffield Wednesday, one against Everton 26 December 1994 and one against Arsenal 4 February 1995. Ingesson later suffered groin injuries and after Francis was replaced by new manager David Pleat, Ingesson was dropped from the starting 11. In November 1995 Ingesson was sold to Bari in Italy.

Coaching career
On 30 September 2013, Ingesson was appointed manager of IF Elfsborg.

Personal life
After retiring from playing Ingesson became a lumberjack, and also appeared as a presenter on the Swedish TV programme Farlig Fritid ("Dangerous Leisures").

On 14 May 2009, Ingesson announced that he had been diagnosed with multiple myeloma. The treatment was at the start said to be going "in the right direction". Ingesson fully recovered and, in December 2010, made a football comeback by accepting an offer to guide the IF Elfsborg under-21 youth team. On 8 January 2013, Ingesson revealed that the myeloma had returned, and that he would have a stem cell transplant, as the two previous autologous (i.e. of his own stem cells) transplants had been unsuccessful.

On 29 October 2014, Ingesson died of the effects of multiple myeloma. He was married and had two children.

Career statistics

International 
Appearances and goals by national team and year

International goals
Scores and results list Sweden's goal tally first.

Managerial statistics

Honours
IFK Göteborg
UEFA Cup: 1986–87
Allsvenskan: 1990
Swedish Champions: 1987, 1990

Bologna
UEFA Intertoto Cup: 1998
Sweden
FIFA World Cup Third Place: 1994

References

External links

1968 births
2014 deaths
Expatriate footballers in England
Expatriate footballers in France
Expatriate footballers in Italy
Expatriate footballers in the Netherlands
Expatriate footballers in Belgium
Swedish expatriate footballers
Swedish footballers
Sweden international footballers
IFK Göteborg players
K.V. Mechelen players
PSV Eindhoven players
Sheffield Wednesday F.C. players
S.S.C. Bari players
Bologna F.C. 1909 players
Olympique de Marseille players
U.S. Lecce players
Allsvenskan players
Serie A players
Serie B players
Premier League players
Ligue 1 players
Eredivisie players
Belgian Pro League players
1990 FIFA World Cup players
1994 FIFA World Cup players
UEFA Euro 1992 players
Deaths from multiple myeloma
Deaths from cancer in Sweden
Association football midfielders
IF Elfsborg managers
Swedish football managers
People from Ödeshög Municipality
Footballers from Östergötland County